Cavin's Milkshake is a dairy-based drink containing medium fat ice cream in a UHT tetra pack, sold in India. Cavin's Milkshake is available in five flavours: Strawberry, Vanilla, Kaju Butterscotch, Chocolate, and Coffee.

Media advertising
Cavin's Milkshake began its television advertising in 2012 with a campaign that focused on "Beat the Junk Food". The tagline for Cavin's Milkshake is "So Tasty; So Good", previously "So Tasty; So Healthy".

See also
Milkshake

References

Further reading

External links

Dairy products